Fortville is an unincorporated community in Jones County, in the U.S. state of Georgia.

History
A post office called Fortville was in operation between 1825 and 1903. The community was named early from a pioneer fort which stood at the site. Variant names were "Old Fort" and "The Fortification".

Country doctor and poet Francis Orray Ticknor (1822-1874) was born in Fortville.

References

Unincorporated communities in Jones County, Georgia